Cephalodiscus nigrescens is a sessile hemichordate belonging to the order Cephalodiscida.

Parasites
The parasitic protozoan Neurosporidium cephalodisci has been found in the nervous system of Cephalodiscus nigrescens.

References

nigrescens